Quick Charge (QC) is a proprietary battery charging protocol developed by Qualcomm, used for managing power delivered over USB, mainly by communicating to the power supply and negotiating a voltage.

Quick Charge is supported by devices such as mobile phones which run on Qualcomm SoCs, and by some chargers; both device and charger must support QC, otherwise QC charging is not attained. It charges batteries in devices faster than standard USB allows by increasing the output voltage supplied by the USB charger, while adopting techniques to prevent the battery damage caused by uncontrolled fast charging and regulating the incoming voltage internally. Many chargers supporting Quick Charge 2.0 and later are wall adaptors, but it is implemented on some in-car chargers, and some power banks use it to both receive and deliver charge.

Quick Charge is also used by other manufacturers' proprietary rapid-charging systems.

Details
Quick Charge is a proprietary technology that can charge battery-powered devices, primarily mobile phones, at power levels exceeding the ten watts (5 volts at 2 amps) supported by the basic USB standard, using existing USB cables. The higher voltage available allows more power (watts) to be supplied through wires without excessive heating. As current is lower for the same power if voltage is increased, there is less resistive loss, which becomes significant for longer cables.

Though not publicly documented, the voltage negotiation between device and charger has been reverse-engineered, and a custom voltage can be manually requested from the charger using a trigger circuit that simulates the negotiation to an end device.

Quick Charge requires both the power supply and the device being charged to support it, otherwise charging falls back to the standard USB ten watts.

Quick Charge 2.0 introduced an optional feature called Dual Charge (initially called Parallel Charging), using two PMICs to split the power into 2 streams to reduce phone temperature.

Quick Charge 3.0 introduced INOV (Intelligent Negotiation for Optimal Voltage), Battery Saver Technologies, HVDCP+, and optional Dual Charge+. INOV is an algorithm that determines the optimum power transfer while maximizing efficiency. Battery Saver Technologies aims to maintain at least 80% of the battery's original charge capacity after 500 charge cycles. Qualcomm claims Quick Charge 3.0 is up to 4–6 °C cooler, 16% faster and 38% more efficient than Quick Charge 2.0, and that Quick Charge 3.0 with Dual Charge+ is up to 7–8 °C cooler, 27% faster and 45% more efficient than Quick Charge 2.0 with Dual Charge.

Quick Charge 4 was announced in December 2016 for the Snapdragon 835 and later chips. Quick Charge 4 supports HVDCP++, optional Dual Charge++, INOV 3.0, and Battery Saver Technologies 2. It is cross-compatible with both USB-C and USB-PD specifications, supporting fallback to USB-PD if either the charger or device is not QC-compatible. However, Quick Charge 4 chargers are not backward compatible with Quick Charge. It also features additional safety measures to protect against over-voltage, over-current and overheating, as well as cable quality detection. Qualcomm claims Quick Charge 4 with Dual Charge++ is up to 5 °C cooler, 20% faster and 30% more efficient than Quick Charge 3.0 with Dual Charge+.

Quick Charge 4+ was announced on June 1, 2017. It introduces Intelligent Thermal Balancing and Advanced Safety Features to eliminate hot spots and protect against overheating and short-circuit or damage to the USB-C connector.  Dual Charge++ is mandatory, while in prior versions Dual Charge was optional. Unlike Quick Charge 4, Quick Charge 4+ is fully backward compatible with Quick Charge C 2.0 and 3.0 devices.

Quick Charge 5 was announced on July 27, 2020. With up to 100W of power, on a mobile phone with a 4500mAh battery, Qualcomm claims 50% charge in just 5 minutes. Qualcomm announced that this standard is cross-compatible with USB PD PPS programmable power supply, and that its technology can communicate with the charger when charging double cells and double the voltage and current out. For instance, a single battery requests 8.8 supply at V; the dual cell can then ask the PPS charger to output 17.6 volts and split it in half to the two separate batteries, providing 5.6 amps total to achieve 100 watts. The first phone supporting this technology was the Xiaomi Mi 10 Ultra.

Quick Charge for Wireless Power 
On February 25, 2019, Qualcomm announced Quick Charge for Wireless Power. Quick Charge for Wireless Power falls back on the Qi standard by the Wireless Power Consortium if either the charger or device is not compatible.

Versions

Other charging protocols

Compatible with QC-enabled chargers
 Adaptive Fast Charging (Samsung)
 BoostMaster (Asus)
 Dual-Engine Fast Charging (Vivo, pre-2020 models only)
 Mi Fast Charge (Xiaomi)
 TurboPower (Motorola)

USB Power Delivery

Other proprietary protocols
 DART (Realme, 2020 onwards) – interchangeable with SuperVOOC
 Pump Express (MediaTek)
 Super Flash Charge (Vivo, 2020 onwards)
 SuperCharge (Huawei)
 SuperVOOC (OPPO, from 2019 to present)
 VOOC (OPPO, until 2019 and pre-2020 Realme models)
 Warp, formerly Dash, Charge (OnePlus) – interchangeable with SuperVOOC
 XCharge (Infinix)

Notes

References

External links 
 Qualcomm Quick Charge
 Qualcomm Quick Charge Technology Device List

Consumer electronics
Qualcomm
Battery chargers